Mona Hala (born on 25 October 1984) is an Egyptian-Austrian actress and hostess.

Early life and career
She born in Egypt to Austrian father and Egyptian mother, her father died when she was at the age of 12.  She staid with her mother in Egypt but maintained Austrian citizenship. She graduated from Ain Shams University with a degree in German-Arabic translations. She began her career as TV Children Shows host. her first role in acting was in Lucky guys series in 2001, then she appeared in TV series The Imperator with Hussein Fahmi and Ilham Chahine, she acted Fawzia Fuad of Egypt in King Farouq in 2008 and in A queen in exile in 2010. In movies she act in Seb wana seeb in 2004, Zaki shan in 2005, Seven colors of sky in 2007, By nature colors in 2009, The Glimpse in 2009, Radio Love in 2011.

Personal life and politics
Mona Hala is known as one of the celebrities who participated in the Egyptian revolution of 2011. She is known for her leftist Ideas, she is a feminist and a socialist, she also defends gay rights.

In 2018 she married her longtime American boyfriend Tomas, he converted to Islam for marriage purposes, she became vegan after meeting with her boyfriend.

Works

Series
 Lucky guys in 2001
 The imperator in 2002
 Shabab online 2 in 2003
 The other side of beach in 2004
 New Egypt in 2004
 Tamea Caviar in 2005
 Cairo welcome you in 2006
 Mowaten bedarajat wazeer in 2006
 Heaven victory in 2006
 El-Andaleeb in 2006
 And The love is strongest in 2006
 Seket eli yeroh in 2006
 Wounded hearts club in 2007
 King Farouq in 2007
 Girls in thirty in 2008
 Ada Alnahar in 2008
 Dead heart in 2008
 Days of horor and love in 2008
 Lamba show in 2008
 The hearts is back in 2008
 The high school in 2009
 Haramt ya baba in 2009
 Love story in 2010
 The truth of illusions in 2010
 quarter problem in 2010
 Leaving with sun in 2010
 Haramt ya baba 2 in 2010
 A queen in exile in 2010
 The other october in 2010
 Years of love and salt in 2010
 The university in 2011
 Aroset yaho in 2012
 Robe mashakel spacy in 2012
 Teery ya tayara in 2012
 Alf salama in 2013
 The best days in 2013

Films
 Albasha Altelmed in 2004
 Seeb wana seeb in 2004
 Zaki shan in 2005
 Seven colors of sky in 2007
 The Baby Doll Night in 2008
 Cairo time in 2009
 The Glimpse in 2009
 In nature colors in 2009
 Radio love in 2011
 The Field in 2011
 Midnight party in 2012
 Paparazzi in 2015
 Hamam sakhen in 2018
 Exterior night in 2018

Short movies
 Jahin quarters in 2004
 Close up in 2005
 House from meat 2005
 Akbar Alkabaer in 2007

Stage
 The accident which happenned in 2010

Hosting
 Yala bena in 2001
 Sah sah maana in 2001
 Belmaqloob in 2010
 Monatoy in 2011

References

External links
 Mona Hala in IMDb

1985 births
Living people
21st-century Egyptian actresses
Egyptian film actresses
Egyptian television actresses
Egyptian comedians
Women comedians
Egyptian socialists
People of the Egyptian revolution of 2011
Ain Shams University alumni
Egyptian feminists
Austrian people of Egyptian descent
Austrian actresses
Egyptian Muslims
Egyptian people of Austrian descent
Egyptian bloggers
Egyptian women bloggers
Austrian bloggers
Austrian women bloggers